Velten (Mark) is a railway station in the town of Velten which is located in the Oberhavel district of Brandenburg, Germany.

References

Railway stations in Brandenburg
Railway stations in Germany opened in 1893
Buildings and structures in Oberhavel